Elections to the 55th Parliament of New South Wales were held on Saturday, 26 March 2011. The 16-year-incumbent Labor Party government led by Premier Kristina Keneally was defeated in a landslide by the Liberal–National Coalition opposition led by Barry O'Farrell.  Labor suffered a two-party swing of 16.4 points, the largest against a sitting government at any level in Australia since World War II. From 48 seats at dissolution, Labor was knocked down to 20 seats—the worst defeat of a sitting government in New South Wales history, and one of the worst of a state government in Australia since federation. The Coalition picked up a 34-seat swing to win a strong majority, with 69 seats–the largest majority government, in terms of percentage of seats controlled, in NSW history. It is only the third time since 1941 that a NSW Labor government has been defeated. It was also notable in that many of Labor's safest seats, such as the seat of Newcastle, were won by the Liberal Party for the first time in history.

New South Wales has compulsory voting, with an optional preferential ballot in single-member seats for the lower house and single transferable vote with optional preferential above-the-line voting in the proportionally represented upper house. The election was conducted by the New South Wales Electoral Commission (NSWEC).

Results

Legislative Assembly

{{Australian elections/Title row
| table style = float:right;clear:right;margin-left:1em;
| title        = New South Wales state election, 26 March 2011
| house        = Legislative Assembly
| series       = New South Wales state election
| back         = 2007
| forward      = 2015
| enrolled     = 4,635,810
| total_votes  = 4,290,595
| turnout %    = 92.55%
| turnout chg  = –0.09%
| informal     = 137,260
| informal %   = 3.20%
| informal chg = +0.43%
}}

|}

{{bar box|float=right|title=Popular vote|titlebar=#ddd|width=600px|barwidth=410px|bars=

}}

Legislative Council

Seats changing hands

 *Figure is Greens vs Liberal
 **Figure is from the 2007 state election, where Rob Oakeshott was the independent candidate.
 In addition, the Liberals retained Ryde and Penrith, which were gained from Labor at by-elections.
 Members listed in italics did not contest their seat at this election.

Background

The centre-left Labor Party, led by Premier Kristina Keneally, and the centre-right Liberal Party, led by Leader of the Opposition Barry O'Farrell, were the two main parties in New South Wales. In the 2007 state election, of 93 seats total, Labor won 52 seats, the Liberals won 22 seats and the Nationals, led by Andrew Stoner, who are in coalition with the Liberals, won 13 seats. Six seats were retained by independents. Smaller parties which hold no seats in the lower house but achieved significant votes in 2007 include The Greens and the Christian Democratic Party.

On 18 October 2008, four state electorates (Lakemba, Ryde, Cabramatta, Port Macquarie) went to by-elections as a result of the resignation of the Premier, two of his ministers, and an independent who left after winning a federal by-election. The results in Ryde, Cabramatta, and Lakemba showed the largest by-election swing against Labor in its history. The results showed a significant swing towards the Liberal Party with a swing of 22.7 percentage points in former health minister Reba Meagher's seat of Cabramatta, but it was retained by ALP candidate Nick Lalich, and a swing of 13 points against Labor in former premier Morris Iemma's seat of Lakemba, also retained by an ALP candidate, Robert Furolo. Ryde, once a safe Labor seat, with a swing of 23.1 points delivered former deputy premier John Watkins' seat to Victor Dominello. Peter Besseling, the independent candidate, won Port Macquarie, left vacant after the resignation of Nationals-turned-independent member Rob Oakeshott, over the Nationals by a two-party margin of 54.5–45.5%, despite a swing of 23.7 points to the Nationals. On 19 June 2010 a by-election in the electoral district of Penrith was triggered as a result of the resignation of Labor Party MP Karyn Paluzzano, with Liberal candidate Stuart Ayres winning the seat with a two-party-preferred swing of more than 25 points, the biggest swing against an incumbent government in New South Wales history, until the 2013 Miranda by-election which eclipsed it with a 26-point two-party swing against the Liberal/National government.

Key dates
 Expiry of 54th Parliament: 12am on Friday, 4 March 2011
 Issue of Writs: 5 March 2011
 Close of Nominations: 10 March 2011
 Polling Day: Saturday 26 March 2011
 Return of the Writs: 30 April 2011
 Meeting of 55th Parliament: By Monday, 16 May 2011

Campaign

The Labor Party launched their campaign on 5 February 2011 in Liverpool within the electoral district of Macquarie Fields. Premier Keneally launched the Labor Party's campaign slogan "Protecting jobs – Supporting families". In attendance for the launch were former Prime Minister Bob Hawke and former Premiers Wran and Carr.

The Liberal and Nationals Coalition launched their campaign on 20 February 2011 at the Joan Sutherland Performing Arts Centre in Penrith within the electoral district of Penrith with the slogan: "Real Change for NSW". In attendance for the launch were both Liberal and Nationals Leaders O'Farrell and Stoner as well as federal Liberal Party leader Tony Abbott, former Liberal Premiers and Leaders Greiner, Fahey, and Chikarovski.

The Coalition had been leading in opinion polling for almost three years, and were unbackable favourites throughout the campaign to win the election. The final Newspoll had support for Labor at an all-time low with 23 percent of the primary vote and 35.9 percent of the two-party vote. Bookmakers were paying $1.01 for a Coalition win with Labor getting as much as $36 and one agency even paid out the winnings and declared the winner a week earlier. At one point, Labor was widely predicted to win as few as 13 seats, seven less than the actual result. According to several pollsters, Labor was in danger of losing several seats where it had not been seriously threatened in decades, as well as several that it had held for a century or more. Indeed, there were concerns that Labor would not win enough seats to form a credible shadow cabinet.

Resulting parliament
The Liberal/National Coalition won the largest proportional number of seats in NSW state history with 69 of 93 seats in the lower house (74.2 percent of the chamber)—in contrast, Labor won 69 of 99 seats (69.7 percent of the chamber) at Neville Wran's second "Wranslide" in 1981 election. Labor won 20 seats, the lowest for Labor in NSW Parliament in over a century, and the worst defeat that a sitting government in NSW has ever suffered. Many prominent Labor MPs and ministers lost their seats including Verity Firth, David Borger, Matt Brown, Jodi McKay, Virginia Judge, Phil Costa and Kevin Greene. In the process, the Coalition took dozens of seats in areas considered Labor heartland, such as western Sydney and the Upper Hunter—some on swings of well over 10 per cent.  The Liberals actually won 51 seats, enough for a majority in their own right—the first time the main non-Labor party in the state had achieved this since adopting the Liberal banner in 1945. Although O'Farrell thus had no need for the support of the Nationals, he opted to retain the Coalition.

In the upper house however, where half of the chamber was up for election, the landslide was not enough to deliver a Coalition majority. Three additional votes outside of the Liberal/National Coalition were required to pass legislation. The balance of power shifted from the Greens to the Shooters and Fishers Party and Christian Democratic Party. With two seats each held by the latter two parties, both needed to give legislative support if Labor and the Greens opposed legislation.

Retiring members
Where a Member of the Legislative Assembly or Legislative Council did not renominate to contest the election, their term ended at the dissolution of the parliament. Members who confirmed their retirement were:

Legislative Assembly

Labor (22)
 Marie Andrews (Gosford)
 John Aquilina (Riverstone)
 Diane Beamer (Mulgoa)
 David Campbell (Keira)
 Barry Collier (Miranda)
 Angela D'Amore (Drummoyne)
 Tanya Gadiel (Parramatta)
 Paul Gibson (Blacktown)
 Kerry Hickey (Cessnock)
 Phil Koperberg (Blue Mountains)
 Grant McBride (The Entrance)
 Gerard Martin (Bathurst)
 Lylea McMahon (Shellharbour)
 Alison Megarrity (Menai)
 Frank Sartor (Rockdale)
 Tony Stewart (Bankstown)
 Joe Tripodi (Fairfield)
 Graham West (Campbelltown)

Liberal (5)
 Peter Debnam (Vaucluse)
 Judy Hopwood (Hornsby)
 Malcolm Kerr (Cronulla)
 Wayne Merton (Baulkham Hills)
 Michael Richardson (Castle Hill)

Nationals (2)
 John Turner (Myall Lakes)
 Russell Turner (Orange)

Legislative Council

Labor (4)
 Tony Catanzariti
 Kayee Griffin
 Christine Robertson
 Ian West

Greens (1)
 Ian Cohen

Opinion polling
Opinion polling was conducted by firms such as Newspoll, Galaxy and Nielsen via random telephone number selection in city and country areas Sampling sizes consist of around 1200–1300 electors. The declared margin of error is ±3 percentage points.

Graphical summary

Primary votes

Two-party preferred

Voting intention

Better Premier and satisfaction

Graphical summary

Newspaper endorsements

See also
 Government of New South Wales
 O'Farrell ministry
 First Baird ministry
 Shadow Ministry of John Robertson
 Post-election pendulum for the 2007 New South Wales state election
Members of the New South Wales Legislative Assembly, 2011–2015
Members of the New South Wales Legislative Council, 2011–2015

References

External links

 ABC Online: 2011 New South Wales Election
 Daily Telegraph: The New South Wales State Election 2011
 2011 NSW State Election Candidates, Parties and Lobbyists - snapshots of their webpages from 2011

Elections in New South Wales
2011 elections in Australia
2010s in New South Wales
March 2011 events in Australia
Landslide victories